Jussi Äijälä (born 27 November 1988) is a Finnish footballer.

References
Guardian Football
Vaasan Palloseura

1988 births
Finnish footballers
Vaasan Palloseura players
Veikkausliiga players
Living people
Oulun Luistinseura players
Association football defenders
Sportspeople from Oulu